Dexter Simmons (born August 27, 1983) is an American fashion designer and reality TV competitor living in Oakland, California. They have appeared in Project Runway and Rihanna's Styled to Rock, a fashion design TV competition show aired on Bravo and Lifetime.

Early life and career 
Dexter Simmons is an American fashion designer raised in Oakland, California. They were on the first season of Styled to Rock, for which Rihanna was the executive producer. Other mentors included Pharrell Williams, Erin Wasson, and Mel Ottenberg. They appeared on the fifteenth season of Project Runway. Their clothing line was presented at the Style Fashion Week L.A. and San Diego Fashion Week in 2013. Their latest collection was featured in New York at Style Fashion Week New York. They have consistently been a featured designer in Dark Beauty Magazine. They appeared on San Diego Living with celebrity designer Andre Soriano.

References

External links 

 
 
 

1983 births
Living people
American fashion designers
LGBT fashion designers
LGBT people from California
People from Oakland, California
Project Runway (American series) participants
21st-century LGBT people